Lisa Harrison (born January 2, 1971) is a former American professional basketball player for the Phoenix Mercury in the Women's National Basketball Association (WNBA).

Early life
Born in Louisville, Kentucky, Harrison learned to play basketball from a young age. In 1989, she was named the Naismith Prep Player of the Year and High School Player of the Year while attending Southern High School, by Parade magazine.  She also was named 1989's Kentucky Miss Basketball.  In 1991, as a sophomore while attending the University of Tennessee, she was a member of their women's basketball team that won the NCAA Women's Division I Basketball Championship.

Professional career
After graduating from Tennessee in 1993, Lisa played one season (1998-1999) for the Columbus Quest of the American Basketball League and two seasons (1997–1999) for the Portland Power.

In the 1999 WNBA Draft, she was selected by the Phoenix Mercury in the third round (34th pick overall).  In the WNBA, Lisa was once ranked eighth in free throw shooting accuracy at 86.4% in 2001.

Outside basketball
Harrison was inducted into the Kentucky High School Athletics Hall of Fame on September 10, 2001.  On September 12, 2006, Harrison was named an outreach coordinator for the athletic department at the University of Louisville.

References

External links

WNBA Player Profile
WNBA Article

1971 births
Living people
All-American college women's basketball players
American women's basketball players
Basketball players from Louisville, Kentucky
Columbus Quest players
Parade High School All-Americans (girls' basketball)
Phoenix Mercury draft picks
Phoenix Mercury players
Portland Power players
Small forwards
Southern High School (Kentucky) alumni
Tennessee Lady Volunteers basketball players